This is a list of disasters that have occurred in Massachusetts organized by death toll.

See also
List of accidents and disasters by death toll
List of natural disasters by death toll
List of disasters in the United States by death toll

Notes

References

Death in Massachusetts
Death Toll
Disasters in Massachusetts
Massachusetts disasters by death toll
Death Toll
Disasters